Geetha Kadambee (born 14 July 1962) is an Indian actress who appears in Malayalam, Tamil, Kannada, Telugu and Hindi films. She debuted in the Tamil film Bairavi (as Rajinikanth's sister). Since then she has acted in over 200 films in all major South Indian languages, and in a few Hindi films. She also appears in South Indian television serials. Geetha has won two Filmfare Awards South and a Karnataka State Film Awards and Kerala State Film Awards each.

Career 
Geetha made her film debut with the 1978 Tamil film Bairavi as the title character in which she played Rajinikanth's sister. She was in her seventh grade when she was cast for the film. She later discontinued her studies to concentrate on her movie career. Her performance as Indira in the 1986 Malayalam film Panchagni based on the true life story of a Naxalite revolutionary Ajitha was well acclaimed and described by The Hindu as "one of Malayalam cinema's landmark heroines". The same year she had more Malayalam releases such as Sukhamo Devi, Kshamichu Ennoru Vakku, Aavanazhi, Geetham, etc. made her a popular actress in Malayalam cinema  She won the State award for the second best actress in 1989 for Oru Vadakkan Veeragatha., most of her notable performances were with Mammootty and Mohanlal

Her notable Kannada movies are with Rajkumar, Ananth Nag, Vishnuvardhan and Ambareesh. Some of her notable movies are Dhruva Thare, Devatha Manushya, Anuraga Aralithu, Shruthi Seridaaga, and Aakasmika with Rajkumar. Other films are Eradu Rekhegalu, Mareyada Manikya, Mrugaalaya, Veeradhi Veera, Mithileya Seethayaru, Nenapina Doni, Bairavi, Shiva Mecchida, Giri Baale, Ramanna Shamanna, Goonda Guru, Nigooda Rahasya, Ramapurada Ravana, Prachanda Kulla, Hrudaya Pallavi, Daada, Aaradhane, Shabarimale Swamy Ayyappa and Aruna Raaga. She formed a successful romantic pair with Ambareesh and acted with him in over fifteen movies.

Geetha also acted in Tamil Serials like Kai Alavu Manasu and Engirindho Vanthaal, both directed by K. Balachander. She also starred in the Tamil Serials such as Katha Kathayaam Karanamaam and recently in Rajakumari, where she played Ramya Krishnan's mother which aired on Sun TV.

She did a cameo as Kamal Haasan's dance partner for the song 'Ve Vela Gopemmala' in K. Viswanath's Sagara Sangamam.

Personal life
In 1997 she married Vasan Thatham, an American CPA and Indian Chartered accountant. The couple live in New Jersey, where Vasan is a business promoter and advisor to corporations. The couple have one son who was born in 1999 

After her marriage, she took a break from acting during 1998 to 2002. She returned to acting in 2003 and has played roles like hero's mother, in movies such as Nuvvostanante Nenoddantana, Okkadu, Pournami, Unakkum Enakkum, Santosh Subramaniam, Azhagiya Tamil Magan and Masters.

Filmography

Tamil

Telugu

Malayalam

Kannada

Hindi

Television

Malayalam 
 Sthreethvam (Surya TV)
 American Dreams (Asianet)
Kuthirakal (Doordarshan)

Tamil 
 Penn
 Anni as Saradha
 Kaialavu Manasu as Saradha
 Kadhal Pagadai
 Oppanai
 Engirindho Vanthaal as Kousalya
 Katha Kathayaam Karanamaam
 Rajakumari (Sun TV)

Telugu 
 Bathuku Jataka Bandi (Zee Telugu)
 Thene Manasulu  (ETV Telugu)

Awards 
Karnataka State Film Awards
Karnataka State Film Award for Best Actress - Aruna Raaga (1986)
Kerala State Film Awards
 1989 - Second Best Actress - Oru Vadakkan Veeragadha

Filmfare Awards South
Filmfare Award for Best Actress - Kannada - Shruthi Seridaaga
Filmfare Award for Best Actress – Malayalam - Aadhaaram

Cinema Express Awards
 1988 :  Best Actress – Malayalam - Vaishalii

References

External links 
 

Actresses from Bangalore
Indian film actresses
Actresses in Tamil cinema
Actresses in Kannada cinema
1962 births
Living people
Kerala State Film Award winners
Actresses in Malayalam cinema
Filmfare Awards South winners
Actresses in Telugu cinema
20th-century Indian actresses
21st-century Indian actresses
Indian television actresses
Actresses in Telugu television
Actresses in Malayalam television
Actresses in Hindi cinema
Actresses in Tamil television